Ferdinand Lindley Augustus Buchanan MC (8 March 1888 – 14 April 1967) was a South African sport shooter who competed in the 1920 Summer Olympics. He also was a general in the South African Army who served in both World War I and World War II.

In 1920 he won the silver medal with the South African team in the team 600 metre military rifle, prone competition. He also participated in the following events:

 Team 300 and 600 metre military rifle, prone - fifth place
 Team 300 metre military rifle, standing - ninth place

References

External links
Olympic profile

1967 deaths
1888 births
South African Army generals
South African military personnel of World War I
South African military personnel of World War II
Recipients of the Military Cross
South African male sport shooters
ISSF rifle shooters
Olympic shooters of South Africa
Shooters at the 1920 Summer Olympics
Olympic silver medalists for South Africa
Olympic medalists in shooting
Medalists at the 1920 Summer Olympics